Living in sin may refer to:

Culture
 Cohabitation, pejoratively; a romantic couple living together while remaining unmarried

Music
 Living in Sin (EP), a 2020 EP by Hooligan Hefs
 "Living in Sin" (song), a 1989 song by Bon Jovi
 "Living in Sin", by Richard A. Whiting, 1931
 "Living in Sin", a song by Gene Simmons from the 1978 album Gene Simmons
 "Living in Sin", a song by Hawaii form the 1983 album One Nation Underground
 "Living in Sin", a song by Mammal from the 2000 album Vol 2: Systematic/Automatic
 "Living in Sin", a song by Virgin Steele from the 1982 album Virgin Steele

See also
 Living in Skin, a 2000 studio album by Jason Harrod
 Understanding New Jersey & Living in Sin, a 2000 album by Vic Ruggiero